Milorad Bukvić (Serbian Cyrillic: Милорад Буквић; born 11 June 1976) is a retired Serbian football striker.

Honours
Artmedia Bratislava
 Slovak Superliga: 2004–05
 Slovak Super Cup: 2005

External links
 

1976 births
Living people
Serbian footballers
Serbian expatriate footballers
RFK Novi Sad 1921 players
FK Vojvodina players
Association football forwards
Expatriate footballers in Romania
Serbian expatriate sportspeople in Romania
ŠK Slovan Bratislava players
FK Cement Beočin players
FC Petržalka players
Expatriate footballers in Slovakia
Serbian expatriate sportspeople in Slovakia
Slovak Super Liga players
Liga I players
FC Argeș Pitești players
FC Vaslui players
ASC Oțelul Galați players
CS Mioveni players
People from Bačka Palanka